Christian Walz (born 4 September 1978, Stockholm) is a Swedish artist, songwriter, and producer. Walz's music is mainly pop/soul. When young Walz attended Adolf Fredrik's Music School in Stockholm. He released his self-titled debut album in 1999, aged 20.

It took five years for the next album to be released. "Paint By Numbers" was released in May 2004, became a Swedish Grammy winner and a big hit. The first single from the album was "Maybe Not", which was then followed "Wonderchild", probably the song he is best known for. A further two singles, "Never Be Afraid Again" and "Hit 'n Run" were released. His third album, "The Corner", was released on 26 November 2008 in Sweden.

Discography 
Christian Walz (1999)
 Nothing's Gonna Change My Mood
 Lovin' Is All Right
 EP
 Spend The Night Together
 Midday, Friday, Payday...
 Sentimental
 Fertilize
 Dancin' To
 More Than Flowers
 1 2 3
 One Time
 Panoum
 Records & Amore / Sacrifice
Paint By Numbers (2004)
 Hit 'n Run
 No No
 You Look All The Same
 Never Be Afraid Again
 Sunday Morning Breakup
 Maybe Not
 Wonderchild
 Die
 I Will Let You Down
 Red Eye
 Missing You
The Corner (2008)
 Corner
 A Beat Like Me
 Whats Your Name?
 Fade Away
 Why You Wanna Save Me
 Atlantis
 Hello
 What A Waste
 Money
 Loveshift
 Producer
 Hold My Hand

Singles

References

Living people
1978 births
Musicians from Stockholm
Swedish male musicians
Melodifestivalen contestants of 2011